VKC Group is a footwear manufacturing and marketing  company, based in the Kozhikode district of Kerala state, in India. V. K. C. Mammed Koya is the founder of VKC Group.

VKC group have a turnover of 600 crs in 2020-21 FY.

References

External links

Indian footwear
Shoe companies of India
Companies based in Kerala
Indian companies established in 1984
Clothing companies established in 1984
Indian brands
1984 establishments in Kerala